Struga  (German Adelsbach) is a village in the administrative district of Gmina Stare Bogaczowice, within Wałbrzych County, Lower Silesian Voivodeship, in southwestern Poland. The village borders with the spa town of Szczawno-Zdrój in the east. It is located within the historic region of Lower Silesia.

The village has a population of 850.

Among the historic architecture of Struga are the Church of Our Lady of Sorrows, dating back to the 14th century, and an 18th-century palace.

The village is known as the site of the Battle of Struga, fought on May 15, 1807, in which the Poles defeated a much larger Prussian army.

References

Struga